Sky Gunner, often stylized as SkyGunner, is a 3D third-person combat flight simulation video game for the PlayStation 2. The game's setting and art style has elements of steampunk. It was developed by PixelArts and was released in Japan on September 27, 2001 by Sony Computer Entertainment. It was released to the North American market by Atlus USA on June 24, 2002.

Plot
Sky Gunner follows the story of 3 ace pilots, Ciel, Copain and Femme, who are hired to protect the "Eternal Engine", an engine capable of perpetual motion. Little do they know, the criminal genius, Ventre, is planning to use the town's celebration aboard the luxury airship, Merveilleux, as an opportunity to steal the Eternal Engine for his own evil ends.

Reception

The game received "generally favorable reviews" according to the review aggregation website Metacritic.  In Japan, Famitsu gave it a score of one eight and three sevens for a total of 29 out of 40, while Famitsu PS gave it a score of one eight, two sevens, and one six for a total of 28 out of 40.

Sequel
In 2006, doujin software house EasyGameStation released a download only PC sequel to Sky Gunner entitled "Gunner's Heart". The game features all of the original cast of the first game, with the addition of two new female antagonists that work with the original game's main antagonist, Ventre. One of the main changes between the two games is the fact that Gunner's Heart is a rail shooter, whereas the original game featured open air flying and gameplay. Gunner's Heart also has new two-player gameplay.

References

External links 

2001 video games
Atlus games
PlayStation 2 games
PlayStation 2-only games
Combat flight simulators
Steampunk video games
Flight simulation video games
Video games developed in Japan